McCormick Place is the largest convention center in North America. McCormick Place hosts numerous trade shows and meetings. The largest regular events are the Chicago Auto Show each February, the International Home and Housewares Show each March and the National Restaurant Association Annual Show each May and the International Manufacturing Technology Show in the fall every other year.

History
As early as 1927, Robert R. McCormick, a prominent member of the McCormick family of McCormick Reaper/International Harvester fame, and publisher of the Chicago Tribune, championed a purpose-built lakeside convention center for Chicago. In 1958, ground was broken for a $35 million facility that opened in November 1960, and was named after McCormick, who died in 1955. The lead architect was Alfred Shaw, one of the architects of the Merchandise Mart. This building included the Arie Crown Theater, designed by Edward Durell Stone. It seated nearly 5,000 people and was the second largest theater (by seating capacity) in Chicago.

The 1960 exposition hall was destroyed in a spectacular fire on January 16, 1967, despite being thought fireproof by virtue of its steel and concrete construction. At the time of the fire, the building contained highly combustible exhibits, several hydrants were shut off, and there were no sprinklers on the main floor where the fire started. Thus the fire spread quickly and destructively, taking the life of security guard Kenneth Goodman.

The fire was investigated by a team led by Rolf H. Jensen, Professor of Fire Protection Engineering at the Illinois Institute of Technology, who later went on to found RJA Group. Many lessons were learned and multiple building, electrical, and fire codes for the city and worldwide were amended to avert a repeat situation.

Although many wanted to rebuild the hall on a different site, Chicago mayor Richard J. Daley elected to rebuild on the foundations of the burned building. The new design of dark steel and glass, by Gene Summers of C. F. Murphy and Associates (and formerly of Mies van der Rohe's office) contrasted markedly with the white look of the structure that had burned. On January 3, 1971, the replacement building, later called the East Building and now called the Lakeside Center, opened with a  main exhibition hall. The Arie Crown Theatre sustained only minor damage in the 1967 fire, and so was incorporated into the interior of the new building. The theater, with the largest seating capacity of any active theater in Chicago (the Uptown Theatre having more seating, but currently closed), underwent major modifications in 1997 to improve its acoustics.

On March 27, 2020, the United States Army Corps of Engineers announced that the complex would begin transforming convention space into a 3,000-bed hospital in the wake of the COVID-19 crisis affecting the Chicago area. The $15 million project was paid for by FEMA and was scheduled for completion on April 30.

In 2021, it was proposed to turn Lakeside Center into a Rivers Casino, as part of the Chicago Casino Proposals.

Additions
The North Building, located west of Lake Shore Drive and completed in 1986, is connected to the East Building by an enclosed pedestrian bridge. In contrast to the dark, flat profile of the East Building, the North Building is white (as the original building was), with twelve concrete pylons on the roof which support the roof using 72 cables. The HVAC system for the building is incorporated into the pylons and give the building the appearance of a rigged sailing ship.

It more than doubled the space in the complex and made McCormick Place the largest convention center in the nation. The South Building was built on the former site of the McCormick Inn, a 25-story, 619-room hotel built in 1973 as part of the McCormick City complex and demolished in 1993.On August 2, 2007, McCormick Place officials opened yet another addition to the complex, the West Building, also designed by tvsdesign and costing $882 million and completed eight months ahead of schedule. The West Building also has  of meeting space, including 61 meeting rooms, as well as a  ballroom, the size of a football field and one of the largest ballrooms in the world.

McCormick Place continued to expand in October 2017 with the opening of Wintrust Arena, a 10,387-seat arena situated on Cermak Road just north of the West Building. The new facility hosts DePaul Blue Demons men's and women's college basketball, and the WNBA's Chicago Sky. The new arena boasts 22 suites, 479 club seats, and 2 VIP lounges. The arena is also equipped to host concerts, sporting events, meetings, and conventions in conjunction with the rest of the McCormick Place complex. Sporting events such as gymnastics and volleyball are also held in the McCormick Place buildings in addition to the arena.

Archival materials are held by the Ryerson & Burnham Libraries at the Art Institute of Chicago. The McCormick Place on the Lake 1971 Collection includes photographs, drawings and project files documenting its construction.

South of the center is McCormick Place Bird Sanctuary, created in 2003. The northern end includes a recreated prairie, covering the roof of the center's underground carpark, and so requiring the use of shallow-rooted plants.

Public transit
The Metra Electric Line stops at a station in the basement of McCormick Place. The South Shore Line also stops at the same station on weekends. The Chicago Transit Authority serves the facility with its Cermak–McCormick Place station on the Green Line, approximately  mile west, and two bus routes.

Busway

The McCormick Place Busway runs  from Lower Randolph between Michigan and Columbus in downtown Chicago to the center.  It uses the lower levels of the multilevel streets near downtown, and surfaces to follow the Metra Electric District right-of-way to outside the South Building of McCormick Place.  Opened in 2002 at a cost of $43 million, it is meant to provide a true and unencumbered expressway for visitors to move between downtown hotels and the convention center, but is also used by buses for Soldier Field events, public safety workers, Metra, convention contractors, and Art Institute deliveries, along with providing a secure route for national and international government officials to utilize between the two points. It is not necessarily restricted only to buses, despite its name.  It is also known as the "Mayor's Road" (as it runs to Maggie Daley Park, which was named in memoriam for mayor Richard M. Daley's wife), the "Bat Cave", the "Magic Road" and a "secret road".  Road use is administered by the Chicago OEMC (Office of Emergency Management and Communications), and regular users are granted access cards.  The convention center advertises the road as a benefit to potential customers.

Gallery

See also 
 Metropolitan Pier and Exposition Authority
 List of convention centers in the United States

References

External links

McCormick Place
Metropolitan Pier and Exposition Authority

 
Buildings and structures in Chicago
Convention centers in Illinois
Event venues established in 1960
Tourist attractions in Chicago
Gymnastics venues in Chicago
Volleyball venues in Chicago